Patrick "Pat" Morris (born April 7, 1954 in Cleveland, Ohio) is a former offensive line coach in the National Football League.

College career
Morris played offensive guard for USC, lettering in 1975.

Coaching

Morris has coached professionally for the Minnesota Vikings, San Francisco 49ers, Detroit Lions, and the Tampa Bay Buccaneers, and at the college football level at the University of Southern California, Northern Arizona, the University of Minnesota, Michigan State and Stanford. He was most-recently the offensive line coach for the Buffalo Bills from 2013–2014, but was let go after the 2014 season. Currently the offensive line coach for the San Diego Fleet of the Alliance of American Football league.

References

External links
 Bills profile
 Vikings profile

1954 births
Living people
Sportspeople from Cleveland
USC Trojans football players
USC Trojans football coaches
Northern Arizona Lumberjacks football coaches
Minnesota Golden Gophers football coaches
Stanford Cardinal football coaches
San Francisco 49ers coaches
Detroit Lions coaches
Minnesota Vikings coaches
Buffalo Bills coaches
Players of American football from Cleveland